SVV may refer to:

 Schiedamse Voetbal Vereniging
 Schweizerischer Vaterländischer Verband
 Simian varicella virus
 Shri Vinayaka Vijayamu, a 1979 Telugu film directed by K. Kameshwara Rao
 abbr. for "si vales valeo" (= if you are well, I am well) 
 abbr. for "sit venia verbo" (= if you will pardon the expression)
 Sodalitas Vulturis Volantis